The Violin Sonata No. 2 in E minor, Op. 108, was written by Gabriel Fauré in 1916, more than 40 years after the first violin sonata. It was premiered on 10 November 1917 at a concert of the Société Nationale de Musique with Louis Capet on the violin and the composer himself playing the piano. At the same concert, the Cello Sonata No. 1 was also premiered. It was dedicated to Queen Elisabeth of Belgium, who was a violinist, and had shown sympathy towards Fauré's works.

Structure
The work consists of three movements. A performance takes approximately 22 minutes.

References

External links
 
 , performed by Arthur Grumiaux and Paul Crossley

Chamber music by Gabriel Fauré
Faure
1916 compositions
Compositions in E minor
Music with dedications